Gabriel Tamunobiebere George Toby is a Nigerian politician of the People's Democratic Party, an economist and a former civil servant who served as Deputy Governor of Rivers State under Governor Peter Odili from 1999 to 2007.

Early life and education
Originally from Opobo, Toby is an alumnus of the University of Nigeria, Nsukka. He studied Economics and received a bachelor's degree in 1963.

Career
Toby worked as a civil servant in various government ministries, rising to the rank of Director General before retiring in 1994. Other offices in which he has served include Pro-Chancellor, and Chairman Governing Council, University of Benin, Pro-Chancellor and Chairman, Governing Council, University of Port Harcourt and Chairman of Council, Rivers State Polytechnic, Bori. In 1999, Toby was chosen as the People's Democratic Party nominee for deputy governor. He was elected eventually and served under Governor Peter Odili. In 2006, he became the first Nigerian to earn the National Merit Award of Accomplished and most Outstanding Deputy Governor in the country.

See also
List of people from Rivers State
Deputy Governor of Rivers State

References

Living people
Rivers State Peoples Democratic Party politicians
Rivers State civil servants
Deputy Governors of Rivers State
Nigerian economists
University of Nigeria alumni
University of Port Harcourt people
People from Opobo
Year of birth missing (living people)